Undertow is a 2004 American psychological thriller film co-written and directed by David Gordon Green and starring Jamie Bell, Devon Alan, Dermot Mulroney and Josh Lucas. Taking place in Georgia, the film tells the story of two boys pursued by a murderous uncle.
 
The film premiered at the 2004 Deauville Film Festival, and released on October 22, 2004 in the United States. Met with a mixed response from critics, the film received special recognition for excellence in filmmaking from the National Board of Review of Motion Pictures.

Plot

Following the death of his wife Audrey, John Munn (Dermot Mulroney) moves with his two sons, mid-teen Chris Munn (Jamie Bell) and adolescent Tim Munn (Devon Alan), to a pig farm in rural Drees County, Georgia, where they lead a reclusive life. Chris is  a rebellious, troubled teen, resulting in frequent contact with police.

John's brother Deel (Josh Lucas) visits the family. The two boys are surprised; they did not even know of his existence. Deel wants a hoard of gold coins from John that their father left them. Deel eventually finds them. John refuses to give them to Deel. In the ensuing struggle, Deel murders him. He tries to kill Chris and Tim as well, but they escape and run away from home with the coins.

On the run, the boys meet an assortment of fairytale-like characters. Deel pursues them, eventually succeeding. Wading into a river, Chris throws away the gold coins into the water. Enraged by the loss, Deel struggles with Chris, attempting to drown him. However, Deel is fatally stabbed in the chest.
 
Chris appears to wake up in hospital. There, he is reunited with Tim and their grandparents.

Cast

Reception
The film received mixed reviews from film critics. On Rotten Tomatoes, it holds an approval rating of 55% based on 120 reviews, with an average rating of 5.96/10. The website's critics consensus reads: "Undertows gently fantastical elements are balanced by fully realized characters and a story with genuine, steadily accumulating emotional weight." On Metacritic, the film earned a score of 63% based on 30 reviews.

Among the critics who gave the film a positive review were Roger Ebert, who praised the film, giving it a full four stars. He wrote of the director, "Green has a visual style that is beautiful without being pretty. We never catch him photographing anything for its scenic or decorative effect." Ebert would later place the film 10th on his list of the best films of 2004. Owen Gleiberman of Entertainment Weekly gave the film a favorable review, calling it an "art film posing as a backwoods gothic thriller." Eric Harrison of the Houston Chronicle wrote, "From its opening lines and first enigmatic image, everything about Undertow is both dreamlike and real, artfully elusive and matter-of-fact."  Movie critic James Berardinelli gave it three out of four stars, giving praise to the performances, and writing, "Those going to Undertow expecting a thriller will find the proceedings slow going. However, those who are seduced by the characters and the setting will find that the 105 minutes pass quickly." The Washington Post's Stephen Hunter thought the film conjured up the 1955 thriller The Night of the Hunter, and wrote, "the movie builds slowly to its grinding climax, and the suspense – the standard by which a thriller must primarily be judged – is first-rate."

Awards and nominations

References

External links
 
 
 Roger Ebert review
 Washington Post review

2004 films
2000s coming-of-age drama films
2004 psychological thriller films
2004 thriller drama films
American coming-of-age drama films
American psychological thriller films
American thriller drama films
Films scored by Philip Glass
Films about brothers
Films about dysfunctional families
Films about farmers
Films directed by David Gordon Green
Films set on farms
Films set in Georgia (U.S. state)
Murder in films
United Artists films
Fratricide in fiction
2004 drama films
2000s English-language films
2000s American films